The Wassel classification is used to categorise radial polydactyly, based upon the most proximal level of skeletal duplication.

Classification

References

Congenital disorders of musculoskeletal system
Supernumerary body parts
Orthopedic classifications